Pedro Luiz Burmann de Oliveira (born 17 February 1992 in Porto Alegre) is a Brazilian sprinter specialising in the 400 metres. He represented his country at the 2013 and 2015 World Championships in Athletics. He competed at the 2020 Summer Olympics.

International competitions

Personal bests
Outdoor
200 metres – 20.81 (+0.8 m/s, São Paulo 2013)
400 metres – 45.52 (São Paulo 2012)

References

External links
 

1992 births
Living people
Sportspeople from Porto Alegre
Brazilian male sprinters
Olympic athletes of Brazil
Athletes (track and field) at the 2016 Summer Olympics
Athletes (track and field) at the 2020 Summer Olympics
World Athletics Championships athletes for Brazil
Pan American Games athletes for Brazil
Athletes (track and field) at the 2015 Pan American Games
Competitors at the 2013 Summer Universiade
20th-century Brazilian people
21st-century Brazilian people